Angelo Raffaele Nolè (born 27 March 1984) is an Italian footballer who plays for Francavilla as a forward.

Career
Nolè started his career at his home town club Potenza S.C., going from non-professional to professional level in 2004, the season that the two clubs from Potenza merged. In July 2007, he was signed by the Serie B team Rimini but loaned to Messina, as the club had Daniele Vantaggiato, Jeda and Emilio Docente as forwards. In the next season he returned to Potenza and after Rimini was relegated in 2009, he returned there and played in 2009–10 Lega Pro Prima Divisione, scored 8 goals, ahead of other forwards such as Docente. Rimini failed to pass the financial test by the Commissione di Vigilanza sulle Società di Calcio Professionistiche (Co.Vi.So.C.) of the Italian Football Federation (FIGC) and was expelled from the professional league.

Ternana
In September 2010, Nolè was signed by Ternana. In July 2011, he renewed his contract with the club. After winning the promotion to Serie B, along with forward Davide Sinigaglia, they were offered extension to their contract.

Lega Pro clubs
On 30 July 2014 Nolè was signed by Bassano. On 27 August 2015 he was signed by Reggiana in a two-year contract.

On 21 January 2017 he's transferred outright to Modena.

References

External links
 La Gazzetta dello Sport profile (2007–08) 
 Football.it profile 
 

Italian footballers
Serie B players
Serie C players
Potenza S.C. players
Rimini F.C. 1912 players
A.C.R. Messina players
Ternana Calcio players
A.S. Pro Piacenza 1919 players
Association football forwards
People from Potenza
1984 births
Living people
Sportspeople from the Province of Potenza
Footballers from Basilicata